Zamalek SC, commonly referred to as Zamalek, is an Egyptian sports club based in Cairo, known for its professional football team. The history of Zamalek SC originates in 1911, when the club was founded by George Merzbach on January 5 as Qasr El Nile (Arabic, translation: The Nile Palace Club). In 1913 the club moved its headquarters to the present-day intersection of 26 July Street and Ramses and became the Cairo International Sports Club, colloquially known as Nady El Qāhirah El Mokhtalat. The name changed again in 1942 to Nady Farouk El Awal at the request of King Farouk I. The current name of Zamalek was chosen in 1952 following the Egyptian revolution.

Early years, Qasr El Nile Club (1911–1913) 
 

Little is known about the very early years of the club. According to historians, the club was established by Belgian lawyer George Merzbach. On December 25, 1910, while attending Cairo Tramways Company's Christmas celebration, Merzbach realized that the company's guest house hosting the celebration on the Nile banks  then the Qasr El Nile casino  would be suitable as a sports club headquarters. During this time, Cairo's main sporting club, Gezira Sporting Club, was for the exclusive use of the British Army; subsequently, Merzbach decided to establish a new club for Egyptian, Belgian and foreign citizens. He did not find difficulties in establishing the club due to his strong ties within the Palace of Khedive Abbas II, as well as many friendships with senior officials of Egyptian society. He was also the private lawyer for Baron Empain and his Cairo Tramways Company. For the new club, he chose the name Qasr El Nile, which means Nile Palace. On January 5, 1911, the club was established, and it was officially opened on February 6 with Marzbech as its president.

Howard Carter, an archaeologist and Merzbach's personal friend, served as vice president. Noah Amin Abdullah, Ahmed Mahmoud Azzam, Khoury Chalhoub (representative of the Cairo Tramways Company), and Paolo Esposito (representative of the Khedivial Palace) formed the rest of the board of directors. It was the first club in Cairo to emerge from non-English expatriate communities. An essential aspect of the club was that it was for all people and not exclusive to any specific social, economic, or ethnic community. It started and continued through World War I under Merzbech's presidency.

Cairo International Sports Club (C.I.S.C.), Nady El Mokhtalat (1913–1941) 

In 1913, the club moved to a second headquarters at present-day intersection of the 26 July and Ramses streets and changed its name to Cairo International Sports Club (C.I.S.C.), which was colloquially translated to the Arabic name Nady El Qāhirah El Mokhtalat or simply Nady El Mokhtalat. The second president was Nicola Arfagi, who also played left wing for the club's football team.  The Sultan Hussein Cup started in 1917 as a competition between Egyptian football clubs and clubs of the Allied armies, including the British. Al Ahly SC  Cairo's other premier sports club   initially refused to take part, leaving C.I.S.C. as the only Egyptian team, but later changed course and joined as a sign of resistance to the British rule. The two clubs played two game in this year. The first took place on February 9, 1917, where Al-Ahly defeated home-team C.I.S.C. 1-0; the second took place on March 2, 1917, where the visiting C.I.S.C. won 1-0.

The club came under severe scrutiny in the same year.board of directors of zamalek raised The twelve issues included that the club's land lease was expired; that the board of directors had not met for a long time, and consisted solely of non-Egyptians; and that there were no lists of members of the club. A general assembly was convened, which issued a decision of non-confidence in the board of directors. Consequently, the board was replaced by Egyptian citizens, including Dr. Mohamed Badr as president, Ibrahim Allam as treasurer, Mustafa Hassan, Fawzi, Captain Hassan and Abdo Al-Jabbawi

In 1921, C.I.S.C. won the Sultan Hussein Cup, becoming the first Egyptian team to ever win a title. In 1922, the club won the inaugural season of the Egypt Cup (in a 2-1 victory over Britain's Schroeders), followed by victories in the 1932, 1935 and 1938 seasons. The club also won the Cairo League in 1930 and 1932.

A new board was formed in 1923 with General Mohamed Heidar as president and Youssef Mohamad as secretary. In the winter of 1924, the club moved for the third time to Geziret Al Zamalek on the west bank of the River Nile, and west of Gezira island and became known as Cairo International Sports Club - Zamalek.

Nady Farouk El Awal (1941–1952) 

The club began the 1940s by winning the King's Cup, as well as the Cairo League in 1940 and 1941. In 1941, Farouk I, King of Egypt and Sudan, bestowed royal sponsorship upon the club, and requested it to change its name to Nady Farouk El Awal (Farouk I Club). Accordingly, Ismail Bak Shirin (of the Muhammad Ali dynasty) took the post of the vice president. This period witnessed the club's biggest victories in the history of the Cairo derby (contested with Al Ahly), with a pair of 6–0 wins in the 1941–42 and 1943-1944 leagues. This record scoreline has not been broken since. The 1943 Egypt Cup was won jointly by Nady Farouk El Awal and Al-Ahly following the cancellation of the final match.

Zamalek Sporting Club and the post-1952 period (1952–1960) 

Following the 1952 Egyptian Coup d'état and the overthrow of King Farouk, the club was renamed Zamalek Sporting Club (Zamalek SC) after the area where the club was situated. Soon after, the club moved to its current location on 26 July Street in Cairo, 500 meters west of the Zamalek bridge, occupying an area of 35 acres (140,000 m2) and hosting 24 different sports.

A new board was formed with Mohammad Shawky as president and secretary and Mohammad Hassan Helmy as assistant secretary. At the time, the rules required that half the club board be changed every year, and Helmy took the position of secretary-general. In 1954, the club's grounds needed renovations, so the board sought a businessman to take over the club and guide the renovation. Abd El Hamid El Shawarbi took the presidency and, although, he was elected for a second period, he was not able to do the job he wanted in the club management.While he was out of the country, Heidar Pasha and Haj Sayed El Annany contributed to forming the VIP and first-class stadium stands; when he came back, he resigned and Shawky became president of the board again. The idea of bringing a businessman to help the club did not subside, thus, businessman Abd El Latif Abo Regeila became the club president in 1956; by then, the rules had been changed allowing the board to stay for 3 years. Once again, Shawky stepped down. Although Regeila was re-elected for a second term, he had to leave Egypt after he lost his money due to the governmental policy against private property. Alwe El Gazzar, the owner of El Sheikh Sherieb Company and then president of the board of the Coca-Cola Company, was then elected president in 1961.

First league championship victory (1960–1983) 

Abdel Latif Abu Regaila, an Egyptian businessman and pioneer of public buses in Cairo, was club president until 1961. During this time, Zamalek Stadium was constructed, which became the club's home grounds. In 1961, Zamalek paid Real Madrid to play against them.

In 1962, a new board was elected with Hassan Amer as president alongside emeritus deputy Mohammad Shawky, Mohammad Lateef, Galal Kereitam, Mahmoud Emam, and Mahmoud Hafez. Amer remained president until Egypt's defeat in the 1967 Six-Day War. Hamada Emam, a popular player, also joined the football team in this year.

Hassan Shehata, believed to be one of the best players in both Egypt and Africa,He is a player and coach who was an integrated player on the defensive and offensive levels. He is accredited with increasing the popularity of Zamalek SC. Shehata led Zamalek club in the 1963/64 season to their second victory in league.  1968, during the War of Attrition, Zamalek hosted the Ismaily and Al Masry clubs and other Suez Canal teams at its grounds.

In 1967, the Minister of Youth and Sports Talat Khairy decided that the club's board would be appointed rather than elected and Mohammed Hassan Helmy became club president, the first spotsman to do so. He became an icon of Zamalek and remained president until July 1971, when the rules were changed to allow board elections again and to forbid anyone from being president if they had already been so for two consecutive terms. Tawfeek El Kheshen took over the presidency and the honorary presidency was given to Helmy.

In 1973, Helmy was again elected president and stayed as the head of the board until 1984.

Championship results 
Zamalek won the Egyptian Premier League for the first time in 1960, followed by victories in 1964, 1965, 1978 and 1984.

They won the Egyptian Cup five times  in 1960, 1962, 1975, 1977 and 1979  and also won the one-off October League Cup in 1974, which replaced the Premier League in that year as a result of the Yom Kippur War and Egypt hosting the 1974 Africa Cup of Nations.

African Uprising (1984–2004) 
Hassan Amer became club president again in 1984, in the same year that Zamalek won their first CAF Champions League title after beating Nigeria's Shooting Stars S.C. 2-0 at Cairo and 0-1 at Lagos. A second title came in the 1986 season. 
Hassan Abo el Fetouh took over from Amer in 1988. During his presidency, the Ministry of Youth and Sports introduced a new rule increasing the number of elected board numbers to ten (although this was reduced again in 1990), and the club built several new buildings, including a gymnasium that is considered to be one of the biggest in the Middle East. Fetouh also increased the funding for most of the club's sports teams and helped achieve several championships. After Fetouh's death in 1990, Galal Ibrahim became temporary president until September 1990, when Nour El-Dali was elected.

Ibrahim was chosen again as president in 1992. New rules required that the vice treasurer be selected by board members; Hamada Emam was selected by default, while Abdel Hamid Shaheen was elected treasurer. The board members were Ahmed Shereen Fawzy, Mahmoud Marouf, Mohamad Fayez El Zummur, Raouf Gaser, and Tarek Ghonaim. An additional requirement was that the board was to have two members under the age of 30, leading to Samy Abo El Kheir and Ihab Ibrahim being elected. The final board members, chosen by the Ministry of Youth and Sports, were Mohamad Amer, General Hanafy Reyad, and Farouk Abo El Nasr.

Zamalek won their third CAF Champion's League title in the 1993 season.

By 1994, Abdel Hamid Shaheen was unable to continue his treasurer duties due to sickness, but the board chose to keep him in his position in honor of his devotion to the club and Farouk Abo El Nasr was appointed to take over his duties. In 1995, four members of the board  Mahmoud Marouf, Mohamad Fayez El Zummur, and Dr. Mohamad Amer   were removed due to their absences from six board meetings. They were replaced by Mortada Mansour, Mahmoud Abdallah, Mounnir Hassan, and Ibrahim Latif. The Ministry objected to having a board made up of both appointed and elected members, so Hassan and Latif forfeited their positions.
Mohamad Amer and Farouk Abo El Nasr were elected in their wake, in support of their abilities and dedication. Shereen Fawzy was selected to be treasurer until the next election. Following the events of the '95/96 season between Zamalek and Ahly,season 95_96 season a one-year temporary club board was selected with Kamal Darweesh as president, Abd EL Aziz Kabil as vice president, Mahmoud Badr El Deen as treasurer, and Hanafy Reyad, Magdy Sharaf, Ismail Selim, Azmy Megahed, and Mohamad Abd El Rahman Fawzy as board members

Ahmed Hossam Mido, considered one of Egypt's best players, started his football career in 1999 at Zamalek, at the age of 16. After retiring in 2013, he became Zamalek's manager and won the 2013–14 Egypt Cup as the youngest Egyptian coach to win a championship.

Kamal Darwish's Era 
 
Kamal Darwish was the president of Zamalek club for two terms from 1996 to 2005. He presided over one of Zamalek's most successful periods across all sports, including football. Zamalek won 16 football championships during his reign, meaning that Darwish is Zamalek's most successful president in its history.

Zamalek was the first Egyptian team to qualify for the 2001 FIFA Club World Championship in Spain (although this was cancelled by FIFA due to funding issues). The club won the African Champions League in 2002, two African Super Cup seasons in 1996 and 2003, and the first two Egyptian Super Cup seasons in 2001 and 2002. Zamalek also won the Egyptian Premier League in the 2000–01, 2002–03 and 2003–04 seasons, and the Egypt Cup in the 1999 and 2002 seasons.

Regression (2005–2013) 
In 2005, Egypt's Minister of Sports dismissed several club boards of Zamalek SC which led to organizational uncertainty because of the changes of board of directors within the period between 2005 and 2013. This period saw only two championships won by Zamalek (Egypt cup 2008 and 2013 Egypt Cup).

The club experienced administrative instability and had several different presidents over just a few years. Mortada Mansour assumed the presidency in 2005 but his board was dissolved shortly after. He was succeeded by Morsi Atallah; Mansour then took the presidency again after but this was also short-lived, as the National Sports Council intervened and appointed a board headed by Muhammad Amir. Amir's term lasted for a year until elections were held in May 2009, which resulted in the election of Mamdouh Abbas as the club's president. Abbas' board was dissolved in 2010 after Mansour obtained a court ruling stating that the elections were rigged, so an interim council, headed by Jala Ibrahim, was installed. Mansour eventually dropped his lawsuit and Abbas returned to the presidency. He was succeeded by Taher Abu Zaid, who then formed an interim council headed by Kamal Darwish.

Reconstruction and reform

Mortada Mansour's Era (2014–2020;2021-present) 

In 2014, Mortada Mansour became Zamalek's president for the third time, and Zamalek rebounded. In his first year, Zamalek won the 2014 Egypt Cup Final (defeating Smouha SC 1–0). The 2014–15 Egyptian Premier League season was equally successful, with players such as Tariq Hamed and Ayman Hefny helping the team win the championship by a nine-point lead with only one loss. Since 2014, the club has won 11 championships.

In the 2015 Egypt Cup Final, Zamalek defeated rival team Al Ahly SC (2-0) and achieved their third consecutive championship title. They then qualified for the semi-finals of the 2015 CAF Confederation Cup.

In 2016, Zamalek finished runner-up in the CAF Champions League and won the Egypt Cup and the Egypt Super Cup.

Two more Egypt Cup titles followed in 2018 and 2019. Zamalek won four other titles in 2019: the CAF Confederation Cup, the Saudi-Egyptian Super Cup, the Egyptian Super Cup and the CAF Super Cup.

Zamalek disasters 

On February 17, 1974, at least forty-eight people died in a stampede at a friendly game against Czechoslovakian club Dukla Prague at the Helmy Zamora Stadium.

Another tragedy took place on February 8, 2015, when twenty supporters were killed during a confrontation with police outside the 30 June Stadium.

References

Zamalek SC